For the 1995 Rugby World Cup in South Africa, the Americas were allocated one direct qualifying place (Americas 1) in addition to the automatic qualification of  which was granted a place due to reaching the quarter-final stages of the 1991 tournament.

The regional bodies, CONSUR representing South America and NAWIRA representing North America, conducted their own qualification matches in the first round determine their respective top teams.

Round 1

South America

Standings

Matches

North America
One-off match

Round 2: Qualifying play-off
Home and away

References

1995
Americas
1993 in South American rugby union
1994 in American rugby union
1994 in Argentine rugby union